Maria Flook is an American writer of fiction and non-fiction.
She is currently Distinguished Writer-in-Residence at Emerson College in Boston.  She won the 2007 John Simon Guggenheim Memorial Foundation Award.

Works
She is the author of the nonfiction books, My Sister Life: The Story of My Sister's Disappearance, (Pantheon, 1998) and New York Times Best Seller  Invisible Eden: A Story of Love and Murder on Cape Cod (Broadway Books, 2003). Her fiction includes the novels Open Water; Family Night, which received a PEN American/Ernest Hemingway Foundation Special Citation;  Lux, (Little, Brown and Company, 2004); Mothers and Lovers (Roundabout Press, 2014) and a collection of stories, You Have the Wrong Man (Pantheon, 1996).  She has also published two collections of poetry, Sea Room and Reckless Wedding, winner of the Houghton Mifflin New Poetry Series. Her work has appeared in the New York Times Book Review, The New Yorker, The New Criterion, TriQuarterly, and More Magazine among others.

References

External links
Official website

20th-century American women writers
20th-century American non-fiction writers
Living people
21st-century American women writers
American women non-fiction writers
21st-century American non-fiction writers
Year of birth missing (living people)